Ryan Hampton may refer to:
 Ryan Hampton (racing driver)
 Ryan Hampton (writer)